Loch Achall (Gaelic: Loch Ach a' Challa - loch of the hazel field) is a freshwater loch, lying  northeast of Ullapool, in Rhidorroch, Ross and Cromarty, Scotland.

Geography
Loch Achall is a long narrow loch,  at its widest point. The loch is fed by the Rivers Rhidorroch and Allt a'Ghiubhais, while the River Ullapool flows from its western end towards Loch Broom.

References

Achall
Achall